Ehsaas: The Feeling  is a 2001 Indian Hindi-language film starring Sunil Shetty and Neha Bajpai.

Plot
After the death of his wife, Aditi, Ravi Naik (Sunil Shetty) must look after his only child – a son – on his own. He brings up his son, Rohan (Mayank Tandon), in a very strict and disciplined atmosphere, so much so that his son starts to resent him and his mannerisms. His immediate neighbors, Antara Pandit (Neha Bajpai) and her mom (Kirron Kher) too are critical of the way Ravi handles his son, and suggest that he adapt a more lenient view. But Ravi ignores this advice. All he wants is to get Rohan to excel as an athlete and win the forthcoming athletics event.

Cast
Suniel Shetty as Ravi Naik
Neha Bajpai as Antara Pandit 
Kiron Kher as Antara's mother-in-law
Mahesh Manjrekar as Michael 
Rakhi Sawant as Maria
Mayank Tandon as Rohan Naik 
Shivaji Satam
Shakti Kapoor as Principal 
Kishore Nandlaskar
Anand Raj Anand 
Sunidhi Chauhan
Sanjay Narvekar

Music
"Kuch Kehna Hai Meri Bhul Huvi" – Udit Narayan, Aditya Narayan
"Yeh Din Bachpan Ke" – Aditya Narayan
"Juhi Ne Dil Manga Mai Nakko Bola" – Atul Kale, Vaishali Samant
"Tumse Milkar Hua Hai Ehsaas" – K. K., Bela Shende
"Ek Bar Pyar Mujhe De" – Sonu Nigam, Sunidhi Chauhan
"Yeh Kaisa Ehsas Hai" – Sunidhi Chauhan, Sonu Nigam
"Zindagi Ek Daud Hai" – Shankar Mahadevan

References

External links 
 

2001 films
2000s Hindi-language films
Films scored by Anand Raj Anand
Indian children's drama films
2000s children's drama films
Films directed by Mahesh Manjrekar